John Shillito Jessop (14 August 1840 – 4 July 1895) was a member of the Queensland Legislative Assembly.

Jessop was born at Whitley, North Yorkshire, England, and educated at private schools at Whitley and Pollington, and at the Snaith Grammar School. In 1859 he arrived in Melbourne, and in 1864 went to Queensland, and came to Dalby in 1867 commenced butchering business.

In January 1882, he was elected to represent Dalby in the Legislative Assembly—a seat he held until 1893 when he was defeated by Joshua Thomas Bell. Jessop was Chairman of Committees in the Assembly from 15 August 1888 to 30 June 1891.

Jessop was president of the Northern Downs Jockey Club, president of the Dalby and Northern Downs Agricultural Association, of the Dalby Hospital, and the Dalby School of Arts, and was also prominently connected with other Institutions, including the Masonic and Oddfellows' lodges.

He died in Dalby, Queensland on 4 July 1895 and was buried in Dalby Monumental Cemetery.

References

1840 births
1895 deaths
Members of the Queensland Legislative Assembly
People from Selby District
English emigrants to Australia
19th-century Australian politicians